Mount Davidson is a  mountain summit located to the north of the head of Waiparous Creek, Municipal District of Bighorn No. 8, southwestern Alberta, Canada. Its nearest higher peak is Waiparous Peak, located on the same ridge  to the northeast. 
The first ascent of the mountain was made in October 1988 by Frank Campbell and Karl Nagy. 

Mount Davidson is named after James Wheeler Davidson (1872 – 1933).

See also

 Geography of Alberta
 Geology of Alberta

References

External links
 Weather: Mount Davidson

Two-thousanders of Alberta
Canadian Rockies